Fred Stammers (25 December 1918 – 14 April 1985) was  a former Australian rules footballer who played with Richmond in the Victorian Football League (VFL).

Notes

External links 
		

1918 births
1985 deaths
Australian rules footballers from Victoria (Australia)
Richmond Football Club players
Sandringham Football Club players